Marlon Rogério Schwantes (born 27 March 1984) is a Brazilian football defender currently playing for NK Konavljanin in Treća HNL Jug.

After starting his career in his home country, playing for a number of local clubs, including SER Panambi, Passo Fundo and São Luiz, Marlon moved in February 2006 to the second-tier Croatian side NK Solin. After a year there, he signed for the Slovenian first-tier side NK MIK CM Celje. A starter in his first season, he missed the 2008/2009 and 2009/2010 seasons due to injury. In the summer of 2010 he signed for the Slovenian second-tier side NK Drava Ptuj, where he played for a year, before moving, in late September 2011, to the Treća HNL Jug side NK Konavljanin.

References

External links
Player profile – PrvaLiga
Player profile – HNL statistika

1984 births
Living people
Brazilian footballers
Brazilian expatriate footballers
Association football defenders
Expatriate footballers in Croatia
NK Solin players
NK Celje players
Expatriate footballers in Slovenia